The Areia Vermelha Marine State Park is a State park in the state of Paraíba, Brazil.

Location

The Areia Vermelha Marine State Park is in the municipality of Cabedelo, Paraíba.
The park is in the caatinga biome.

The Areia Vermelha is a sandbar that is uncovered only at low tide, separated from the sea by the line of reefs that protects the whole length of the Paraíba coastline.
The sandbank attracts many visitors on the weekends who walk, swim and investigate the pools.
It is surrounded by corals with typical fauna.

History

The Areia Vermelha Marine State Park was created by state law 21.263 of 28 August 2000.
It is administered by the Environmental Management Superintendence of Paraíba (Sudema).

Studies prepared during development of the Management Plan showed serious degradation of the environment by intense and uncontrolled human activities and by practices incompatible with maintenance of the fauna and flora.
On 12 November 2015 an agreement was made between the state and municipal government to better protect the park.
As of January 2016 new rules were implemented that included prohibition of the sale of consumption of food and beverages in the park, and a ban on motor boats, carts, grills, tables and chairs.
The food prohibition was because left-overs were attracting catfish, upsetting the delicate ecological balance of the reef.

Notes

Sources

State parks of Brazil
Protected areas established in 2000
2000 establishments in Brazil
Protected areas of Paraíba